Bernhard Weis (born 10 March 1976) is a German former professional footballer who played as a striker.

External links

1976 births
Living people
German footballers
Association football forwards
2. Bundesliga players
FC Vaduz players
FC Augsburg players
FC Bayern Munich II players
SV Waldhof Mannheim players
SV Eintracht Trier 05 players
German expatriate footballers
German expatriate sportspeople in Liechtenstein
Expatriate footballers in Liechtenstein